Marie Jesika Dalou (born ) was a Mauritian weightlifter, competing in the 75 kg category and representing Mauritius at international competitions. 

She participated at the 2004 Summer Olympics in the 75 kg event.

Major results

References

External links
 
 
 http://www.the-sports.org/marie-jesika-dalou-weightlifting-spf7593.html
 http://news.bbc.co.uk/sport2/hi/olympics_2004/weightlifting/results/3532102.stm

1979 births
Living people
Mauritian female weightlifters
Weightlifters at the 2004 Summer Olympics
Olympic weightlifters of Mauritius
Place of birth missing (living people)